The Department for Environment, Food and Rural Affairs (DEFRA) is a department of His Majesty's Government responsible for environmental protection, food production and standards, agriculture, fisheries and rural communities in the United Kingdom. Concordats set out agreed frameworks for co operation, between it and the Scottish Government, Welsh Government and Northern Ireland Executive, which have devolved responsibilities for these matters in their respective nations.

Defra also leads for the United Kingdom on agricultural, fisheries and environmental matters in international negotiations on sustainable development and climate change, although a new Department of Energy and Climate Change was created on 3 October 2008 to take over the last responsibility; later transferred to the Department for Business, Energy and Industrial Strategy following Theresa May's appointment as Prime Minister in July 2016.

Creation
The department was formed in June 2001, under the leadership of Margaret Beckett, when the Ministry of Agriculture, Fisheries and Food (MAFF) was merged with part of the Department of Environment, Transport and the Regions (DETR) and with a small part of the Home Office.

It was created after the perceived failure of MAFF, to deal adequately with an outbreak of Foot and Mouth disease. The department had about 9,000 core personnel, .

In October 2008, the climate team at Defra was merged with the energy team from the Department for Business Enterprise and Regulatory Reform (BERR), to create the Department of Energy and Climate Change, then headed by Ed Miliband.

Ministers
The Defra Ministers are as follows:

The Permanent Secretary is Tamara Finkelstein, who replaced Clare Moriarty in 2019.

Shadow ministers portfolios can differ from government departments therefore overlap.

Responsibilities
Defra is responsible for British Government policy in the following areas

 Adaptation to global warming
 Agriculture
 Air quality
 Animal health and animal welfare
 Biodiversity
 Conservation
 Chemical substances and pesticides
 Fisheries
 Flooding
 Food
 Forestry
 Hunting
 Inland waterways
 Land management
 Marine policy
 National parks
 Noise
 Plant health
 Rural development
 Sustainable development
 Trade and the environment
 Waste management
 Water management

Some policies apply to England alone due to devolution, while others are not devolved and therefore apply to the United Kingdom as a whole.

Executive agencies
The department's executive agencies are:
 Animal and Plant Health Agency (formerly the Animal Health and Veterinary Laboratories Agency, formed by a merger of Animal Health and the Veterinary Laboratories Agency, and later parts of the Food and Environment Research Agency. Animal Health had launched on 2 April 2007 and was formerly the State Veterinary Service)
 Centre for Environment, Fisheries and Aquaculture Science
 Rural Payments Agency
 Veterinary Medicines Directorate

Key delivery partners
The department's key delivery partners are:
 Agriculture and Horticulture Development Board
 Consumer Council for Water
 Environment Agency
 Fera Science (formerly the Food and Environment Research Agency, now a company in which Defra holds a 25% stake)
 Forestry Commission (a non-ministerial government department including Forest Enterprise and Forest Research)
 Joint Nature Conservation Committee
 Marine Management Organisation (launched on 1 April 2010, incorporates the former Marine and Fisheries Agency)
 National Forest Company
 Natural England (launched on 11 October 2006, formerly English Nature and elements of the Countryside Agency and the Rural Development Service)
 Ofwat (a non-ministerial government department formally known as the Water Services Regulation Authority)
 Royal Botanic Gardens, Kew
 Sea Fish Industry Authority
A full list of departmental delivery and public bodies may be found on the Defra website.

Defra in the English regions

Policies for environment, food and rural affairs are delivered in the regions by Defra's executive agencies and delivery bodies, in particular Natural England, the Rural Payments Agency, Animal Health and the Marine Management Organisation.

Defra provides grant aid to the following flood and coastal erosion risk management operating authorities:
 Environment Agency
 Internal drainage boards
 Local authorities

Aim and strategic priorities
Defra's overarching aim is sustainable development, which is defined as "development which enables all people throughout the world to satisfy their basic needs and enjoy a better quality of life without compromising the quality of life of future generations." The Secretary of State wrote in a letter to the Prime Minister that he saw Defra's mission as enabling a move toward what the World Wide Fund for Nature (WWF) has called "one planet living".

Under this overarching aim, Defra has five strategic priorities:
 Climate change and energy.
 Sustainable consumption and production, including responsibility for the National Waste Strategy.
 Protecting the countryside and natural resource protection.
 Sustainable rural communities.
 A sustainable farming and food sector including animal health and welfare.

Defra Headquarters are at 2, Marsham Street, London. It is also located at Nobel House, 17, Smith Square, London.

See also
 Air Quality Expert Group
Badger culling in the United Kingdom
 Cattle Health Initiative
 Department of Agriculture and Rural Development (Northern Ireland)
 Energy policy in the United Kingdom
 Energy use and conservation in the United Kingdom
 Environmental contract
 List of atmospheric dispersion models
 National Bee Unit
 National Collection of Plant Pathogenic Bacteria
 New Technologies Demonstrator Programme
 Nicola Spence
 Scottish Executive Environment and Rural Affairs Department
 UK Dispersion Modelling Bureau
 United Kingdom budget
 Waste Implementation Programme

References

External links
 Defra's official website
 Fera - Executive agency of DEFRA
 National Collection of Plant Pathogenic Bacteria - Fera
 English Nature's website
 JNCC's website
 Defra's wiki for formulating an environmental contract
 Air Quality Expert Group

Video clips
 DEFRA YouTube channel

 
Agricultural organisations based in England
United Kingdom
Environment of England
Ministries established in 2001
2001 establishments in the United Kingdom
Forestry agencies in the United Kingdom
United Kingdom